Blood and Thunder: An Epic of the American West (Doubleday, 2001), is a non-fiction book written by American historian and author, Hampton Sides. It focuses on the transformation of the American West during the 19th Century.

Key figures 
Kit Carson: Frontiersman, wilderness guide and member of the Union Army.
Narbona: Prominent Navajo strongman and leader.
Stephen W. Kearny: Brigadier General in the United States Army and fixture of the Mexican–American War.
Henry Hopkins Sibley: Brigadier General in the Confederate States Army.

See also 
Manifest Destiny
Battle of Valverde
Battle of San Pasqual
Long Walk of the Navajo

Reviews 
 The New York Times, The New York Times Book Review
USA Today, Book Reviews
The Washington Post

Media 
Google Books
National Public Radio, Author Interviews
On Point with Tom Ashbrook; WBUR-FM, Boston
CBS News Sunday Morning
C-SPAN; Cities Tour
C-SPAN.
The Diane Rehm Show, NPR
 The New York Times Best Seller list, The New York Times Book Review

References 

2001 non-fiction books
History books about the American Old West